Bartlettina is a genus of flowering plants in the family Asteraceae. They are native to tropical regions of Mesoamerica and South America. The genus was erected to house several plants separated from genus Eupatorium.

These are shrubs or perennial herbs with woody bases. The oppositely arranged leaves have smooth or serrated edges. The flower heads contain tubular florets.

The best known species may be the blue mist flower (B. sordida), which is cultivated as an ornamental plant and has become naturalized outside its native range.

 Species

 formerly included
 Bartlettina ehrenbergii (Hemsl.) R.M.King & H.Rob., Synonym of Bartlettina macrocephala (Benth.) R.M.King & H.Rob.
 Bartlettina lanicaulis (B.L.Rob.) B.L.Turner, Synonym of Critonia lanicaulis (B.L.Rob.) R.M.King & H.Rob.
 Bartlettina ruae (Standl.) R.M.King & H.Rob., Synonym of Bartlettina pansamalensis (B.L.Rob.) R.M.King & H.Rob.

References

 
Asteraceae genera
Taxonomy articles created by Polbot